The 2022 FBD Insurance Connacht GAA Senior Football Competition was an inter-county Gaelic football competition in the province of Connacht. All five Connacht county teams participated, but no college or university teams. All games took place at the Connacht GAA Centre of Excellence under the new air-supported dome, the first inter-county games to take place under a roof.

 were the winners.

Competition format
The competition is a straight knockout. Drawn games go to a golden score extra-time period.

Fixtures

References

FBD Insurance League
FBD Insurance League